Hovik or Hovig is an Armenian given name. Høvik with a diacritics and the alternative Hovig is a Scandinavian name.

Hovik, Hovig, or Høvik may refer to:

Hovig
Hovig Demirjian (born 1989), Armenian Cypriot singer

Hovik
Hovik Abrahamyan (born 1958), Armenian politician, Speaker of the National Assembly of Armenia, and Prime Minister of Armenia
Hovik Vardoumian (born 1940), Armenian short story writer and novelist
Hovik Keuchkerian (born 1972), Spanish-Armenian actor
Kjell Hovik (born 1937), Norwegian pole vaulter
Hovik Hayrapetyan Equestrian Centre, an equestrian complex and horse racing hippodrome in Yerevan, Armenia

Høvik
Høvik, a suburb in the municipality of Bærum, Norway
Høvik Verk, a district in the municipality of Bærum, Norway
Høvik Station, a railway station at Høvik, Bærum, Norway

See also
Hovig, a given name and surname